Robert H. Solo (December 4, 1932 – August 27, 2018) was an American film producer.  He was the producer of such films as Invasion of the Body Snatchers (1978), Bad Boys (1983), Colors (1988), Body Snatchers (1993) and Blue Sky (1994).

Personal life
Solo was born in Waterbury, Connecticut.  He was married to Judith Solo and they had a son, Matt, and a daughter, Robin.  Solo died on August 27, 2018 at the age of 85.

Filmography
He was a producer in all films unless otherwise noted.

Film

References

External links

People from Waterbury, Connecticut
American film producers
Film producers from Connecticut
1932 births
2018 deaths